The Cuslett Formation is a geologic formation in Nova Scotia. It preserves fossils dating back to the Cambrian period.

See also

 List of fossiliferous stratigraphic units in Nova Scotia

References
 

Cambrian Nova Scotia
Cambrian south paleopolar deposits